The 1975 Kansas City Royals season was their seventh in Major League Baseball. The Royals' 91–71 record was the best in franchise history and Kansas City finished second in the American League West, six games behind the Oakland Athletics. Manager Jack McKeon was fired on July 24 and was replaced by Whitey Herzog. John Mayberry became the first Royals player to hit at least 30 home runs in a season (34) and also set a franchise single-season record with 106 runs batted in.

Offseason 
 January 24, 1975: Harmon Killebrew was signed as a free agent by the Royals.

Regular season

Season standings

Record vs. opponents

Notable transactions 
 April 10, 1975: Doug Corbett was released by the Royals.
 June 3, 1975: 1975 Major League Baseball draft
Clint Hurdle was drafted by the Royals in the 1st round (9th pick).
Ron Hassey was drafted by the Royals in the 22nd round, but did not sign.
 September 15, 1975: Mark Williams was traded by the Royals to the Oakland Athletics for Rick Ingalls (minors).

Roster

Player stats

Batting

Starters by position 
Note: Pos = Position; G = Games played; AB = At bats; H = Hits; Avg. = Batting average; HR = Home runs; RBI = Runs batted in

Other batters 
Note: G = Games played; AB = At bats; H = Hits; Avg. = Batting average; HR = Home runs; RBI = Runs batted in

Pitching

Starting pitchers 
Note: G = Games pitched; IP = Innings pitched; W = Wins; L = Losses; ERA = Earned run average; SO = Strikeouts

Other pitchers 
Note: G = Games pitched; IP = Innings pitched; W = Wins; L = Losses; ERA = Earned run average; SO = Strikeouts

Relief pitchers 
Note: G = Games pitched; W = Wins; L = Losses; SV = Saves; ERA = Earned run average; SO = Strikeouts

Farm system 

LEAGUE CHAMPIONS: Waterloo

Notes

References

External links 
1975 Kansas City Royals at Baseball Reference
1975 Kansas City Royals at Baseball Almanac

Kansas City Royals seasons
Kansas City Royals season
Kansas City